The 2006–07 season was Coventry City's 87th season in The Football League and their 6th consecutive season in the Football League Championship. Along with competing in the Championship, the club also participated in the FA Cup and Football League Cup. The season covers the period from 1 July 2006 to 30 June 2007.

Matches

Pre-season friendlies

Championship

League Cup

FA Cup

Season statistics

Starts and goals

Notes: 
Player substitutions are not included.

Goalscorers
15 players scored for Coventry City during the 2006–07 season.

49 goals were scored in total during the 2006–07 season:
45 in the Championship
1 in the League Cup
3 in the FA Cup

The top goalscorer was Dele Adebola with 9 goals.

Discipline

Yellow cards
18 players were booked for Coventry City during the 2006–07 season.

87 bookings were received in total during the 2006–07 season:
81 in the Championship
2 in the League Cup
4 in the FA Cup

The most booked player was Kevin Kyle with 12 cards.

Red Cards
1 player was sent off for Coventry City during the 2006–07 season.

1 player was sent off in total during the 2006–07 season.
1 in the Championship
The most sent off player was David McNamee with 1 sending off.

Transfers

In

Out

Loans in

Loans out

Kit Profile

|
|
|}

References

External links
 Official Site: 2006/2007 Fixtures & Results
 BBC Sport – Club Stats
 Soccerbase – Results | Squad Stats | Transfers

Coventry City F.C. seasons
Coventry City